One on One is the second studio album by British pop singer Yazz.  The album was released in April 1994, more than five years after her debut album, Wanted. The album contains the UK top 40 hit single "How Long", a duet with Aswad.

Background
Yazz commenced recording sessions for a second album with Big Life Records in 1989, as the follow-up to Wanted.  Following the release of the "Treat Me Good" single (UK No. 20, SUI No. 28, NED No. 48, GER No. 55, AUS No. 100) in June 1990, an album titled Revolution of Love was scheduled for release, but was ultimately shelved when Yazz parted with the record company.

Following the release of Yazz's first single with Polydor Records in March 1992, "One True Woman" (UK No. 60), an album of the same name was planned for release in May 1992, but was cancelled.  Several tracks recorded for this album ended up on One on One, eventually released two years later, although "One True Woman" was not among them.

Singles
Three singles were released from the album: a cover version of the Ace song "How Long" (UK No. 31, GER No. 52), "Have Mercy" (UK No. 42, GER No. 86), and a cover version of The Korgis' "Everybody's Got to Learn Sometime" (UK No. 56).  The album failed to chart, however.

Track listing
"Have Mercy"
"Calling to You"
"Child"
"One on One"
"How Long" (featuring Aswad)
"Back in Love Again"
"Baby Talk"
"Everybody's Got to Learn Sometime"
"Look of Love"
"Live Your Life"
"That's Just the Way That It Is"

References

External links
One on One at Discogs

1994 albums
Yazz albums
Albums produced by Stephen Lipson
Polydor Records albums